The Pappinisseri mangrove theme park is a controversial eco-tourism project on the banks of Valapattanam river in Kannur.

Photo gallery

See also
Kallen Pokkudan

References

Mangroves
Tourist attractions in Kannur district
Dharmashala, Kannur